Eduard de Atzel (born 11 March 1917, date of death unknown) was a Peruvian sports shooter. He competed at the 1960 Summer Olympics and the 1964 Summer Olympics.

References

External links
 

1917 births
Year of death missing
Peruvian male sport shooters
Olympic shooters of Peru
Shooters at the 1960 Summer Olympics
Shooters at the 1964 Summer Olympics
Sportspeople from Budapest